Events in the year 1732 in Norway.

Incumbents
Monarch: Christian VI

Events

Arts and literature
The Speigelberg Company performs in Norway.

Births

15 April - Morten Leuch, timber merchant and landowner (died 1768).
1 July - Even Hammer, civil servant (died 1800).

Deaths

See also

References